Diplodactylus savagei, known commonly as the yellow-spotted Pilbara gecko, is a species of lizard in the family Diplodactylidae. The species is endemic to Australia.

Etymology
The specific name, savagei, is in honor of American herpetologist Jay M. Savage.

Geographic range
D. savagei is found in the Pilbara region of Western Australia.

Habitat
The preferred natural habitats of D. savagei are shrubland, grassland, and rocky areas.

Description
Dorsally, D. savagei is dark reddish brown, with yellowish spots which tend to form transverse dashes. The ventral surfaces are white.

Reproduction
D. savagei is oviparous.

References

Further reading
Cogger HG (2014). Reptiles and Amphibians of Australia, Seventh Edition. Clayton, Victoria, Australia: CSIRO Publishing. xxx + 1,033 pp. .
Kluge AG (1963). "Three new species of the Gekkonid Lizard genus Diplodactylus Gray from Australia". Records of the South Australian Museum 14 (3): 545-553 + Plates 34–35. (Diplodactylus savagei, new species, pp. 550–553 + Plate 35).
Wilson, Steve; Swan, Gerry (2013). A Complete Guide to Reptiles of Australia, Fourth Edition. Sydney: New Holland Publishers. 522 pp. .

savagei
Reptiles described in 1963
Taxa named by Arnold G. Kluge
Geckos of Australia